Order of Knowledge is one of the badges of honor in Iran. Its establishment dates back to the Qajar dynasty era under the name of "Order of Science" that later in Pahlavi dynasty era its name changed to "Order of Knowledge". Finally, it was reestablished in Islamic Republic era by "Council of Iran Ministers" on November 21, 1990.

Qajar dynasty version
The Qajar dynasty ruling over Iran from 1789 to 1925. The founding history of this order dates back to Qajar era. The order was known at that time by the name of "Order of Science".

Pahlavi dynasty version
The Pahlavi dynasty was the reigning constitutional monarchy ruling over Iran from 1925 to 1979. In Pahlavi era the "Order of Science" was renamed to "Order of Knowledge" which to this day remains the same name.

That "Order of Knowledge" medal was made of silver and had an eight-pointed stellar design. At the center of it was a Pahlavi Crown of gold in a blue enamel background. It was located around the central part of those olive theme branches. It had a diameter of 53 mm and a ribbon with two red stripes and one white stripe alternately.

Islamic Republic version
According to "Article 7" of the "Regulations on the Awarding of Government Orders" of Iran approved on November 21, 1990, the "Order of Knowledge" is awarded to individuals who have made significant and unprecedented efforts to improve the country's scientific performance in the following ways:

 Presenting valuable scientific works and essays
 Sincere effort and service to promote the scientific level of scholars by teaching at universities in the country

Recipients

Types
The "Order of Knowledge" has three types of medal:

See also
 Order of Freedom (Iran)
 Order of Altruism
 Order of Work and Production
 Order of Research
 Order of Mehr
 Order of Justice (Iran)
 Order of Construction
 Order of Education and Pedagogy
 Order of Persian Politeness
 Order of Independence (Iran)
 Order of Service
 Order of Courage (Iran)
 Order of Culture and Art
 Order of Merit and Management
 Order of Fath
 Order of Islamic Republic
 Order of Nasr

References

External links
 Orders of Iran Regulations in diagrams
 Orders of Iran in diagrams
 Types of Iran's badges and their material benefits

CS1 uses Persian-language script (fa)
Awards established in 1990
Civil awards and decorations of Iran
1990 establishments in Iran